The Girl from a Far River is a 1928 Soviet silent drama film directed by Yevgeni Chervyakov.

Cast
 Roza Sverdlova as Chizhok 
 Vladimir Romashkov as Chizhok's Grandfather 
 Pyotr Kirillov as Aleksey  
 Mikhail Gipsi as Old Hunter  
 Aleksandr Gromov as Public Speaker

References

Bibliography 
 Christie, Ian & Taylor, Richard. The Film Factory: Russian and Soviet Cinema in Documents 1896-1939. Routledge, 2012.

External links 
 

1928 films
Soviet silent feature films
1920s Russian-language films
Films directed by Yevgeni Chervyakov
Soviet black-and-white films
Soviet drama films
1928 drama films
Silent drama films